Cyclopogon elegans is a species of terrestrial orchids in the genus Cyclopogon native to Brazil and Argentina.

References

External links 

Spiranthinae
Plants described in 1944
Orchids of Brazil
Orchids of Argentina